Eden Prairie Town Center station is one of four light rail stations planned in Eden Prairie, Minnesota on the Southwest LRT extension of the Green Line. In 2015, the station was deferred as a part of budget cuts in the planning process for the Southwest LRT. However in 2017, the city of Eden Prairie agreed to pay for the engineering design work for the station. The city of Eden Prairie officially received federal grant funding which enabled the station to be in the final construction plan for the Southwest LRT. The station will be located near the Eden Prairie Center shopping center and south of the intersection of I-494 and U.S. Route 212.

References

Metro Green Line (Minnesota) stations
Railway stations scheduled to open in 2025
Railway stations under construction in the United States